Muhammad Ali and Richard Dunn fought a boxing match on May 24, 1976. Ali won the bout by knocking out Dunn in the fifth round. The fight is remembered for being the last time Ali would knock down any opponent in the ring in his boxing career.

The punch Ali used to knockout Dunn was taught to Ali by Taekwondo Grandmaster Jhoon Rhee. Rhee called that punch the "Accupunch", he learnt it from Bruce Lee. Rhee was Ali's head coach for this Dunn fight.

References

Dunn
1976 in boxing
World Boxing Association heavyweight championship matches
World Boxing Council heavyweight championship matches
May 1976 sports events